Plumley is a civil parish in Cheshire East, England. It contains seven buildings that are recorded in the National Heritage List for England as designated listed buildings.  Of these, one is listed at Grade II*, the middle grade, and the others are at Grade II.  The parish is mainly rural, and the listed buildings consist of farmhouses, a farm building, a cottage, a country house with a bridge giving access to it, and a public house.

Key

Buildings

See also

Listed buildings in Tabley Inferior
Listed buildings in Toft
Listed buildings in Peover Inferior
Listed buildings in Nether Peover
Listed buildings in Lostock Gralam
Listed buildings in Wincham
Listed buildings in Pickmere

References
Citations

Sources

 

Listed buildings in the Borough of Cheshire East
Lists of listed buildings in Cheshire